This article discusses the history of whaling from prehistoric times up to the commencement of the International Whaling Commission (IWC) moratorium on commercial whaling in 1986. Whaling has been an important subsistence and economic activity in multiple regions throughout human history. Commercial whaling dramatically reduced in importance during the 19th century due to the development of alternatives to whale oil for lighting, and the collapse in whale populations. Nevertheless, some nations continue to hunt whales even today.

Early history 

Humans have engaged in whaling since prehistoric times. Early depictions of whaling at the Neolithic Bangudae site in Korea, unearthed by researchers from Kyungpook National University, may date back to 6000BCE. The University of Alaska Fairbanks has described evidence for whaling at least as early as circa 1000BCE.

The oldest known method of catching cetaceans is dolphin drive hunting, in which a number of small boats are positioned between the animal and the open sea and the animals are herded towards shore in an attempt to beach them. This method is still used for smaller species such as pilot whales, beluga whales, porpoises and narwhals, as described in A Pattern of Islands, a memoir published by British administrator Arthur Grimble in 1952.

Another early method used a drogue (a semi-floating object) such as a wooden drum or an inflated sealskin tied to an arrow or a harpoon. Once the missile had been shot into a whale's body, the buoyancy and drag from the drogue would eventually cause the whale to tire, allowing it to be approached and killed. Cultures that practiced whaling with drogues included the Ainu, Inuit, Native Americans, and the Basque people of the Bay of Biscay. The Bangudae petroglyphs show sperm whales, humpback whales and North Pacific right whales surrounded by boats, and suggest that drogues, harpoons and lines were being used to kill small whales as early as 6000BCE. Cetacean bones of the same period were also found in the area, reflecting the importance of whales in the diet of prehistoric coastal people.

Whale bones recovered near the Strait of Gibraltar raise the possibility that whales were hunted in the Mediterranean Sea by ancient Rome

Whaling history by region

North America

New England 

Beginning in the late colonial period, the United States grew to become the preeminent whaling nation in the world by the 1830s. American whaling's origins were in New York and New England, including Cape Cod, Massachusetts and nearby cities. Whale oil was in demand chiefly for lamps. By the 18th century whaling in Nantucket had become a highly lucrative deep-sea industry, with voyages extending for years at a time and traveling as far as South Pacific waters. During the American Revolution, the British navy targeted American whaling ships as legitimate prizes. In turn, many whalers fitted out as privateers against the British.

Whaling recovered after the war ended in 1783 and the industry began to prosper, using bases at Nantucket and then New Bedford. Whalers took greater economic risks in search of profit, expanding their hunting grounds. Investment and financing arrangements allowed managers of whaling ventures to share their risks by selling some equity, but retain a substantial portion of the profit. As a result, they had little incentive to plan their voyages to minimize risk.

Ten thousand seamen manned the ships, including more than 3,000 African American seamen. Early whaling efforts concentrated on right whales and humpbacks, which were found near the American coast. As these populations declined and the market for whale products grew, American whalers began hunting sperm whales. The sperm whale was particularly prized for spermaceti, a dense waxy substance that burns with an exceedingly bright flame that is found in the spermaceti organ, located forward and above the skull. Hunting sperm required longer whaling voyages.

Whale oil was essential for illuminating homes and businesses in the 19th century, and lubricated the machines of the Industrial Revolution. Baleen (the long keratin strips that hang from the top of whales' mouths) was used by manufacturers in the United States and Europe to make varied consumer goods.

British competition and import duties drove New England whaling ships out of the North Atlantic and into the southern oceans, ultimately making whaling into a global economic enterprise. The mid 19th century was the golden age of American whaling.

From the Civil War, when Confederate raiders targeted American whalers, through the early 20th century, the American whaling industry suffered economic competition, especially from kerosene, a superior fuel for lighting.

Localities 

A number of New England towns were heavily involved in whaling, particularly Nantucket and New Bedford. Nantucket began whaling in 1690 after recruiting a whaling instructor, Ichabod Paddock. The south side of the island was divided into three and a half mile sections, each with a mast erected to look for the spouts of right whales. Once a whale was sighted, rowing boats were sent from the shore. If the whale was successfully killed it was towed ashore, flensed (i.e., the blubber was cut off), and the blubber boiled in cauldrons known as "try pots". Even when whales were caught far offshore, the blubber was still boiled on shore well into the 18th century. New Bedford whaling was established when prominent Nantucket whaling families moved their operations to the town for economic reasons, and made New Bedford the fourth busiest port in the United States. In Herman Melville's novel Moby-Dick the narrator begins his whaling voyage from New Bedford.

In the late 1870s, schooners began hunting humpbacks in the Gulf of Maine. In 1880, with the decline of menhaden fish, steamers began to switch to hunting fin and humpback whales using bomb lances. This has been called "shoot-and-salvage" because of the high-rate of loss due to whales sinking, lines breaking, etc. The first such whale hunting ship was the steamer Mabel Bird, which towed whale carcasses to an oil processing plant in Boothbay Harbor. At its height in 1885 four or five steamers were engaged in whale fishery at Boothbay Harbour, dwindling to one by the end of the decade. Over 100 whales were killed annually during some years. The fishery ended in the late 1890s.

Technological advancement  
In the 1850s, the Euro–American whalemen began a serious attempt at catching rorquals such as the blue whale and fin whale.  In the 1860s Captain Thomas Welcome Roys invented a rocket harpoon, making a significant contribution to the development of the California whaling industry. In 1877, John Nelson Fletcher, a pyrotechnist, and a former Confederate soldier, Robert L. Suits, modified Roys's rocket, marketing it as the "California Whaling Rocket". The rocket was highly effective in killing whales.

Danish naval officer Captain Otto C. Hammer and the Dutchman Captain C. J. Bottemanne also imitated Roys' rocket harpoon. Hammer formed the Danish Fishing Company, which operated from 1865 to 1871.  Botteman formed the Netherlands Whaling Company, which operated from 1869 to 1872.

Legacy 
In 1996, the New Bedford Whaling National Historical Park was established, offering exhibits on the history of the "City that Lit the World".

Pacific Northwest 

Whaling on the Pacific Northwest Coast encompassed both aboriginal and commercial whaling. The indigenous peoples of this coast have whaling traditions dating back millennia. A memoir by John R. Jewitt, an English blacksmith who spent three years as a captive of the Nuu-chah-nulth people from 1802 to 1805, makes clear the importance of whale meat and oil to their diet. Whaling was integral to the cultures and economies of other indigenous people as well, notably the Makah and Klallam. For other groups, especially the Haida, whales appear prominently as totems.

Hunting of cetaceans continues by Alaska Natives (mainly beluga and narwhal, plus subsistence hunting of the bowhead whale) and to a lesser extent by the Makah (gray whale). Commercial whaling in British Columbia and southeast Alaska ended in the late 1960s.

Bering Strait

In the 1840s, large numbers of bowhead whale were discovered around the Bering Strait. In 1848, American whaler Thomas Welcome Roys returned with a significant catch which drew the industry's attention. More than 500 whales were caught the following year and more than 2,000 in 1850. The whaling boom drew more than 220 ships in 1852 but it collapsed almost as soon as it began, with catches severely diminishing in 1853.

Basque Country (Spain and France) 

The first mention of Basque whaling was made in 1059, when it was said to have been practiced at the Basque town of Bayonne. The fishery spread to what is now the Spanish Basque Country in 1150, when King Sancho the Wise of Navarre granted petitions for the warehousing of such commodities as whalebone (baleen). At first, they hunted the North Atlantic right whale, using watchtowers (known as vigias) to look for their distinctive twin vapor spouts.

By the 14th century, Basque whalers were making "seasonal trips" to the English Channel and southern Ireland. The fishery spread to Terranova (Labrador and Newfoundland) in the second quarter of the 16th century, and to Iceland by the early 17th century. They established whaling stations in Terranova, mainly in Red Bay, and hunted bowheads as well as right whales.

The fishery in Terranova declined for a variety of reasons, including the conflicts between Spain and other European powers during the late 16th and early 17th centuries, attacks by hostile Inuit, declining whale populations, and perhaps the opening up of the Spitsbergen fishery in 1611.

The first voyages to Spitsbergen by the English, Dutch, and Danish relied on Basque specialists, with the Basque provinces sending out their own whaler in 1612. The following season San Sebastián and Saint-Jean-de-Luz sent out a combined eleven or twelve whalers to the Spitsbergen fishery, but most were driven off by the Dutch and English.  Two more ships were sent by a merchant in San Sebastián in 1615, but both were driven away by the Dutch. Conflict over the Spitsbergen whaling grounds between the English, French, Dutch and Danish continued until 1638.

Whale fishing in Iceland and Spitsbergen continued at least into the 18th century, but Basque whaling in those regions appears to have ended in 1756 at the beginning of the Seven Years' War.

Greenland and Spitsbergen

Encouraged by reports of whales off the coast of Spitsbergen, Norway, in 1610, the English Muscovy Company (also known as the Russian Company) sent a whaling expedition there the following year. The expedition was a disaster, with both ships sent being lost. The crews returned to England in a ship from Hull. The following year two more ships were sent. Other countries followed suit, with Amsterdam and San Sebastian each sending a ship north. The latter ship returned to Spain with a full cargo of oil. Such a fabulous return resulted in a fleet of whaleships being sent to Spitsbergen in 1613. The Muscovy Company sent seven, backed by a monopoly charter granted by King James I. They met with twenty other whaleships (eleven or twelve Basque, five French, and three Dutch), as well as a London interloper, which were either ordered away or forced to pay a fine of some sort. The United Provinces, France, and Spain all protested against this treatment, but James I held fast to his claim of sovereignty over Spitsbergen.
 	
The following three and a half decades witnessed numerous clashes between the various nations (as well as infighting among the English), often merely posturing, but sometimes resulting in bloodshed. This jealousy stemmed as much from the mechanics of early whaling as from straightforward international animosities. In the first years of the fishery England, France, the United Provinces and later Denmark–Norway shipped expert Basque whalemen for their expeditions. At the time Basque whaling relied on the utilization of stations ashore where blubber could be processed into oil. In order to allow a rapid transference of this technique to Spitsbergen, suitable anchorages had to be selected, of which there were only a limited number, in particular on the west coast of the island.
 	
Early in 1614, the Dutch formed the Noordsche Compagnie (Northern Company), a cartel composed of several independent chambers (each representing a particular port). The company sent fourteen ships supported by three or four men-of-war this year, while the English sent a fleet of thirteen ships and pinnaces. Equally matched, they agreed to split the coast between themselves, to the exclusion of third parties. The English received the four principal harbors in the middle of the west coast, while the Dutch could settle anywhere to the south or north. The agreement explicitly stated that it was only meant to last for this season.
 	
In 1615 the Dutch arrived with a fleet of eleven ships and three men-of-war under Adriaen Block, occupied Fairhaven, Bell Sound, and Horn Sound by force, and built the first permanent structure on Spitsbergen: a wooden hut to store their equipment in. The ten ships sent by the Muscovy Company were relegated to the south side of Fairhaven, Sir Thomas Smith's Bay, and Ice Sound. The Danes meanwhile sent a fleet of five sail under Gabriel Kruse to demand a toll from the foreign whalers and in doing so assert Christian IV's claim of sovereignty over the region, but both the English and Dutch rebuffed his efforts—two ships from Bordeaux chartered by a merchant in San Sebastian were also sent away by the Dutch. The following year, 1616, the English, with a fleet of ten ships, occupied all the major harbors, appropriated the Dutch hut, and made a rich haul, while the Dutch, preoccupied with Jan Mayen, only sent four ships to Spitsbergen, which "kept together in odd places... and made a poor voyage."
 
In 1617 a ship from Vlissingen whaling in Horn Sound had its cargo seized by the English vice-admiral. Angry, the following season the Dutch sent nearly two dozen ships to Spitsbergen. Five of the fleet attacked two English ships, killing three men in the process, and also burned down the English station in Horn Sound. Negotiations between the two nations followed in 1619, with James I, while still claiming sovereignty, would not enforce it for the following three seasons. When this concession expired, the English twice (in 1623 and 1624) tried to expel the Dutch from Spitsbergen, failing both times.
 	
In 1619 the Dutch and Danes, who had sent their first whaling expedition to Spitsbergen in 1617, firmly settled themselves on Amsterdam Island, a small island on the northwestern tip of Spitsbergen; while the English did the same in the fjords to the south. The Danish–Dutch settlement came to be called Smeerenburg, which would become the centre of operations for the latter in the first decades of the fishery. Numerous place names attest to the various nations' presence, including Copenhagen Bay (Kobbefjorden) and Danes Island (Danskøya), where the Danes established a station from 1631 to 1658; Port Louis or Refuge Français (Hamburgbukta), where the French had a station from 1633 to 1638, until they were driven away by the Danes (see below); and finally English Bay (Engelskbukta), as well as the number of features named by English whalemen and explorers—for example, Isfjorden, Bellsund, and Hornsund, to name a few.
 	
Hostilities continued after 1619. In 1626 nine ships from Hull and York destroyed the Muscovy Company's fort and station in Bell Sound, and sailed to their own in Midterhukhamna. Here they were found by the heavily armed flagship of the London whaling fleet; a two-hour battle ensued, resulting in defeat for the Hull and York fleet and their expulsion from Spitsbergen. In 1630 both the ships of Hull and Great Yarmouth, who had recently joined the trade, were driven away clean (empty) by the ships from London. From 1631 to 1633, the Danes, French, and Dutch quarreled with each other, resulting in the expulsion of the Danes from Smeerenburg and the French from Copenhagen Bay. In 1634 the Dutch burned down one of the Danes' huts. There were also two battles this season, one between the English and French (the latter won) and the other between London and Yarmouth (the latter won, as well). In 1637 and again in 1638 the Danes drove the French out of Port Louis and seized their cargoes. In the former year they also seized a French ship in the open sea and detained it in Copenhagen Bay, while in the latter year they also held two Dutch ships captive in the same bay for over a month, which led to protests from the Dutch. Following the events of 1638 hostilities, for the most part, ceased, with the exception of a few minor incidents in the 1640s between the French and Danes, as well as between Copenhagen and Hamburg and London and Yarmouth, respectively.
 	
The species hunted was the bowhead whale, a baleen whale that yielded large quantities of oil and baleen. The whales entered the fjords in the spring following the breakup of the ice. They were spotted by the whalemen from suitable vantage points, and pursued by shallops, chaloupes or chalupas, which were manned by six men. (These terms derive from the Basque word "txalupa", used to name the whaling boats that were widely utilized during the golden era of Basque whaling in Labrador in the 16th century.) The whale was harpooned and lanced to death and either towed to the stern of the ship or to the shore at low tide, where men with long knives would flense (cut up) the blubber. The blubber was boiled in large copper kettles and cooled in large wooden vessels, after which it was funneled into casks. The stations at first only consisted of tents of sail and crude furnaces, but were soon replaced by more permanent structures of wood and brick, such as Smeerenburg for the Dutch, Lægerneset for the English, and Copenhagen Bay for the Danes.
 		 	
Beginning in the 1630s, for the Dutch at least, whaling expanded into the open sea. Gradually whaling in the open sea and along the ice floes to the west of Spitsbergen replaced bay whaling. At first, the blubber was tried out at the end of the season at Smeerenburg or elsewhere along the coast, but after mid-century the stations were abandoned entirely in favor of processing the blubber upon the return of the ship to port. The English meanwhile stuck resolutely to bay whaling, and didn't make the transfer to pelagic (offshore) whaling until long after.
In 1719, the Dutch began "regular and intensive whaling" in the Davis Strait, between Greenland and Canada's Baffin Island. The British South Sea Company financed 172 whaling voyages to Greenland from London's Howland Dock between 1725 and 1732. Beginning in 1733, the British Government offered a 'bounty' for whale oil, leading to further expansion. However, due to reductions in the bounty and wars with America and France, London's Greenland fleet fell to 19 in 1796.

During the 17th and 18th century North Frisian Islanders had a reputation of being very skilled mariners, and most Dutch and English whaling ships bound for Greenland and Svalbard would recruit their crew from these islands.  Around the year 1700, Föhr island had a total population of roughly 6,000, of whom 1,600 were whalers. In 1762, 25% of all shipmasters on Dutch whaling vessels were people from Föhr, and the South Sea Company's  commanding officers and harpooners were exclusively from Föhr. Sylt island and Borkum island were also notable homes of whaling personnel.

The British would continue to send out whalers to the Arctic fishery into the 20th century, sending their last on the eve of the First World War.

Japan 

The oldest written mention of whaling in Japanese records is from Kojiki, the oldest Japanese historical book, which was written in the 7th century CE. This book describes whale meat being eaten by Emperor Jimmu. In Man'yōshū, an anthology of poems from the 8th century CE, the word "Whaling" (いさなとり) was frequently used in depicting the ocean or beaches.

One of the first records of whaling using harpoons is from the 1570s at Morosaki, a bay attached to Ise Bay. This method of whaling spread to Kii (before 1606), Shikoku (1624), northern Kyushu (1630s), and Nagato (around 1672).

Kakuemon Wada, later known as Kakuemon Taiji, was said to have invented net whaling sometime between 1675 and 1677. This method soon spread to Shikoku (1681) and northern Kyushu (1684)

Using the techniques developed by Taiji, the Japanese mainly hunted four species of whale: the North Pacific right, the humpback, the fin, and the gray whale. They also caught the occasional blue, sperm, or sei/Bryde's whale .

In 1853, the US naval officer Matthew Perry forced Japan to open up to foreign trade. One purpose of his mission was to gain access to ports for the American whaling fleet in the north-west Pacific Ocean. Japan's traditional whaling was eventually replaced in the late 19th century and early 20th century with modern methods.

Britain 

Britain's involvement in whaling extended from 1611 to the 1960s and had three phases. The Northern (or Arctic) whale fishery lasted from 1611 to 1914 and involved whaling primarily off Greenland, and particularly the Davis Strait. The Southern (or South Seas) whale fishery was active from 1775 to 1859 and involved whale hunting first in the South Atlantic, then in the Indian and Pacific Oceans. British law defined and differentiated the two trades. Finally, modern British involvement in whaling extended from 1904 to 1963. Each of these three trades involved different species of whales as targets.

Northern whale fishery 
From 1753 to 1837 whalers from Whitby were active in the Davis Strait. In 1832 the Phoenix was the only vessel to go out, returning with a record 234 tons of oil. Both vessels returned with large volumes of oil, but the price of whale oil and whalebone had fallen. After unsuccessful voyages in 1837 both ships were withdrawn from whaling, ending whaling from Whitby.

Southern whale fishery 
The Southern fishery was launched when Samuel Enderby, along with Alexander Champion and John St Barbe, using American vessels and crews, sent out twelve whaleships in 1776. In 1786, the Triumph was the first British whaler to be sent east of the Cape of Good Hope, and in 1788, the whaler Emilia was sent west around Cape Horn into the Pacific Ocean to become the first ship of any nation to conduct whaling operations in the Southern Ocean. Emilia returned to London in 1790 with a cargo of 139 tons of whale oil.  The first sperm whale killed in the Southern fishery was taken off the coast of Chile on 3 March 1789.

In 1784 the British had 15 whaleships in the southern fishery, all from London. Between 1793 and 1799 there was an average of 60 vessels in the trade, increasing to 72 in 1800–1809. The first sperm whale off the coast of New South Wales, Australia, was taken by the ship Britannia (Commander Thomas Melvill) in October 1791.

In 1819 the British whaler Syren, under Frederick Coffin of Nantucket, sailed to the coastal waters of Japan. She returned to London on 21 April 1822, with 346 tons of whale oil. By 1825 the British had 24 vessels there.

The number of vessels being fitted out annually for the southern fishery declined from 68 in 1820 to 31 in 1824. In 1825, there were 90 ships in the southern fishery, but by 1835 it had dwindled to 61 and by 1843 only 9 vessels left for the southern fishery. In 1859 the trade from London ended.

Antarctic whaling 
The shore stations on the island of South Georgia were at the center of the Antarctic whaling industry from its beginnings in 1904 until the late 1920s when pelagic whaling increased. The activity on the island remained substantial until around 1960, when Norwegian–British Antarctic whaling came to an end.

France 

In 1786, William Rotch, Sr. established a colony of Nantucket whalemen in Dunkirk. By 1789 Dunkirk had 14 whaling ships sailing to Brazil, Walvis Bay, and other areas of the South Atlantic to hunt sperm and right whales. In 1790 Rotch sent the first French whalers into the Pacific. The majority of the French whaling ships were lost during the Anglo-French War (1793-1802). Whaling began to revive after the war ended, but when Napoleon came to power Rotch's holdings in Dunkirk were seized.

After the Napoleonic Wars the government issued subsidies in an attempt to revive whaling, and in 1832 this effort succeeded. In 1835 the first French whaleship, the Gange, reached the Gulf of Alaska and found abundant right whales. In 1836, the first French whaler reached New Zealand. In 1851, the French government passed a law to encourage whaling but this was not successful. Whaling in France ended in 1868.

Iceland 

In 1883 the first whaling station was established in Alptafjordur, Iceland, by a Norwegian company. Between 1889 and 1903 nine more companies established themselves in Iceland. Catching peaked in 1902, when 1,305 whales were caught to produce 40,000 barrels of oil. Whale hunting had largely declined by 1910, when only 170 whales were caught.

A ban on whaling was imposed by the Althing in 1915. In 1935 an Icelandic company established a whaling station that shut down after only five seasons. In 1948, another Icelandic company, Hvalur H/F, purchased a naval base at the head of Hvalfjörður and converted it into a whaling station. Between 1948 and 1975, an average of 250 Fin, 65 Sei, and 78 sperm whales were taken annually, as well as a few blue and humpback whales. Unlike the majority of commercial whaling at the time, this operation was based on the sale of frozen meat and meat meal, rather than oil. Most of the meat was exported to England, while the meal was sold locally as cattle feed.

Scandinavia 

There is strong evidence of active, large-scale whaling in Scandinavia from the 6th century onwards.

Scandinavia's whaling industry invented many new techniques in the 19th century, with most inventions occurring in Norway. Jacob Nicolai Walsøe was probably the first person to suggest mounting a harpoon gun in the bows of a steamship, while Arent Christian Dahl experimented with an explosive harpoon in Varanger Fjord (1857–1860). In 1863 Svend Foyn invented a harpoon with a flexible joint between the head and shaft and adapted Walsøe and Dahl's ideas, initiating the modern whaling era.

Later, cannon-fired harpoons, strong cables, and steam winches were mounted on maneuverable, steam-powered catcher boats. They made possible the targeting of large and fast-swimming whale species that were taken to shore-based stations for processing. Breech-loading cannons were introduced in 1925; pistons were introduced in 1947 to reduce recoil. These highly efficient devices reduced whale populations to the point where large-scale commercial whaling became unsustainable.

Finnmark 
In February 1864, Svend Foyn began his first whale-hunting trip to Finnmark in the schooner-rigged, steam-driven whale catcher Spes et Fides (Hope & Faith). The ship had seven guns on her forecastle, each firing a harpoon and grenade separately. Several whales were seen, but only four were captured. After two unsuccessful trips in 1866 and 1867, he invented a harpoon gun that fired a grenade and harpoon at the same time and was able to catch thirty whales in 1868. He patented his grenade-tipped harpoon gun two years later.

Foyn was given a virtual monopoly on the trade in Finnmark in 1873, which lasted until 1882. Despite this, local citizens established a whaling company in 1876, and soon others defied his monopoly and formed companies. Unrestricted hunting began in 1883, triggering a large increase in the number of whale catchers. At the peak, in 1896–1898, between 1,000 and 1,200 whales were caught each year. The last station closed down in 1904.

Spitsbergen 
In 1903, the wooden steamship Telegraf (737 gross tons) embarked on a whale catching trip to Spitsbergen. She returned with 1,960 barrels of oil produced from a catch of 57 whales, of which 42 were blue whales. By 1905, there were eight companies operating around Spitsbergen and Bear Island, and 559 whales (337 blue) were caught to produce 18,660 barrels. Operations were suspended in 1912.

Faroe Islands 

During the early 1900s the whaling stations in the Faroe Islands included:

 Gjánoyri on Streymoy, situated in the sound between the islands of Streymoy and Eysturoy, established in 1894;
 Norðdepil on Borðoy in the Northern Islands (Norðoyar), established in 1898 and closed down in 1920;
 Lopra on the island of Suðuroy, established in 1901 and closed down in 1953;
 Funningsfjørður on Eysturoy, established in 1901;
 Við Áir whaling station, established in 1905 and closed down in 1984.

Peak catching was reached in 1909, when 773 whales were caught to produce 13,850 barrels of oil. In 1917, with the war and poor catches, whaling was suspended. The islanders' main interest in whaling was cheap meat, while 90% of the proceeds from the oil went abroad, mostly to Norway. Four Norwegian companies resumed catching in 1920 but quickly stopped. In 1933 the two remaining whaling stations in Lopra and Við Áir were taken over by Faroese owners. From 1977 to 1984 the whaling station Við Áir was owned and operated by the Faroese government.

The buildings and the equipment of Við Áir whaling station are still in existence. The Faroese Ministry of Culture (Mentamálaráðið) recommended conservation in 2007, suggesting that the whaling station be made into a maritime museum with activities for the visitors.

Twentieth century 

By 1900, bowhead, gray, and right whales were nearly extinct, and whaling had declined. It revived with the invention of harpoons shot from cannons, explosive tips and factory ships, which allowed distant whaling. Whaling expanded in the northern hemisphere, then in the southern hemisphere. As each species was reduced to the point where it was hard to find, whalers moved on to the next species, catching blue whales, fin whales, sperm whales, sei whales and minke whales in sequence.

The League of Nations held a conference on whaling in 1927, and in 1931 27 countries signed a convention for the regulation of whaling. The convention was not enforceable, and a record ~43,000 whales were caught in 1931. In 1932, whaling companies formed a cartel, which cut harvests for two years, but then failed. A 1937 convention agreed to shorter seasons and to sparing bowhead, gray and right whales, and whales under a minimum size. Ships killed faster to harvest as many as possible in the shorter season.

In 1946, 15 whaling nations formed the International Whaling Commission, with membership also open to non-whaling nations. It prohibited killing gray, humpback and right whales, limited hunting seasons, and set an Antarctic limit of 16,000 "Blue Whale Units" per year, but again had no enforcement ability. In 1949–1952 more than 2,000 humpbacks per year were harvested in the Antarctic, despite an annual quota of 1,250. In 1959–1964, there were disagreements over a moratorium on blue whales and humpbacks, with scientific advice eventually recommending a limit of 2,800 blue whale units. The IWC adopted quotas of 8,000. In 1970 the United States prohibited import of whale products by adding all commercial whales to its Endangered Species List.

Proposals for 10-year moratoria were rejected in 1971, 1972 and 1974, but species quotas were adopted and reduced. Consumer boycotts focused on Japanese and Russian products began in 1974, to protest the hunting of large whales by these countries. In 1978, the IWC called for an end to international trade in whale products. In 1982, the IWC adopted a ban on commercial whaling, to start in 1986. Japan, Norway and the USSR filed objections so the moratorium would not apply to them. Chile and Peru also filed objections, but Peru later agreed to be covered, and Chile stopped whaling.

No international quotas were ever put on beluga whales and narwhals; 1,000 to 2,000 of each have been killed each year to the present, mostly in Alaska, Canada and Greenland.

Catches by country and year
Sources: IWC Summary Catch Database version 6.1, July 2016, which includes great whales, orcas (mostly caught by Norway and USSR), bottlenose whales (mostly Norway), pilot whales (mostly Norway), and Baird's Beaked Whales (mostly Japan). This database also has some pre-1900 counts, not shown here.

The IWC database is supplemented by Faroese catches of pilot whales, Greenland's and Canada's catches of Narwhals (data 1954–2014), Belugas from multiple sources shown in the Beluga whale article, Indonesia's catches of sperm whales, bycatch in Japan 1980–2008, and bycatch in Korea 1996–2017. The IWC database includes illegal whaling from USSR and Korea. This is supplemented by academic findings on Korea for 1999–2003.

Note that most species of dolphins are omitted. Otherwise the main areas of missing data are: bycatch in countries other than Japan and Korea (generally much smaller), narwhals before 1954; belugas in Canada and USA before 1970, and in Nunavut (Canada) for all years; belugas in USSR in Bering, East Siberian and Laptev Seas and Sea of Okhotsk outside Amur River area.

Catches by country and species

Sources: same as counts by year, above.

See also 

 Whaling in Australia
 Whaling in Canada
 Whaling in the Netherlands
 Whaling in New Zealand
 Whaling in Norway
 Whaling in Scotland
 Whaling in the United Kingdom
 Whaling in the United States
 Nantucket Whaling Museum

Footnotes

References

Sources 
 
 
 
 
 
 Dow, George Francis. Whale Ships and Whaling: A Pictorial History. (1925, reprinted 1985). 253 pp
 Edvardsson, R., and M. Rafnsson. 2006. Basque Whaling Around Iceland: Archeological Investigation in Strakatangi, Steingrimsfjordur.
 
 
 
 
 
  Contains a detailed contemporaneous description of the industry.
 
 Mageli, Eldrid. "Norwegian-Japanese Whaling Relations in the Early 20th Century: a Case of Successful Technology Transfer". Scandinavian Journal of History 2006 31(1): 1–16.  Full text: Ebsco
 
 
 Morikawa, Jun. Whaling in Japan: Power, Politics, and Diplomacy (2009) 160 pages
 
 Proulx, Jean-Pierre. Whaling in the North Atlantic: From Earliest Times to the Mid-19th Century. (1986). 117 pp.
 Purchas, S. 1625. Hakluytus Posthumus or Purchas His Pilgrimes: Contayning a History of the World in Sea Voyages and Lande Travells by Englishmen and others. Volumes XIII and XIV (Reprint 1906, J. Maclehose and sons).
 Schokkenbroek, Joost C. A. (2008). Trying-out: An Anatomy of Dutch Whaling and Sealing in the Nineteenth Century, 1815–1885. Amsterdam: Aksant Academic Publishers.  (cloth)
 
 
 
 Sangmog Lee "Chasseurs de Baleines dans la fries de Bangudae" Errance, (2011) 
 Stoett, Peter J. The International Politics of Whaling (1997) online edition
 Tonnesen, J. N. and Johnsen, A. O. The History of Modern Whaling. (1982). 789 pp.
 
 
 Weatherill, Richard (1908) The ancient port of Whitby and its shipping. (Whitby: Horne and Son)
 Wolfe, Adam. "Australian Whaling Ambitions and Antarctica". International Journal of Maritime History 2006 18(2): 305–322. 
 Young, George (D.D.), (1840) A Picture of Whitby and its Environs.
 
 BBC News report on the engravings

North America 
 Allen, Everett S. Children of the Light: The Rise and Fall of New Bedford Whaling and the Death of the Arctic Fleet. (1973). 302 pp.
 
 Busch, Briton Cooper. "Whaling Will Never Do for Me": The American Whaleman in the Nineteenth Century. (1994). 265 pp
 Creighton, Margaret S. Rites and Passages: The Experience of American Whaling, 1830–1870. (1995). 233 pp. excerpt and text search
 Davis, Lance E.; Gallman, Robert E.; and Gleiter, Karin. In Pursuit of Leviathan: Technology, Institutions, Productivity, and Profits in American Whaling, 1816–1906. (NBER Series on Long-Term Factors in Economic Development.) 1997. 550 pp. advanced quantitative economic history
 Dickinson, Anthony B. and Sanger, Chesley W. Twentieth-Century Shore-Station Whaling in Newfoundland and Labrador. 2005. 254 pp.
 
 George, G. D. and R. G. Bosworth. 1988. Use of Fish and Wildlife by Residents of Angoon, Admiralty Island, Alaska. Division of Subsistence. Alaska Department of Fish and Game, Juneau, Alaska.
 Gidmark, Jill B. Melville Sea Dictionary: A Glossed Concordance and Analysis of the Sea Language in Melville's Nautical Novels (1982) online edition
 Lytle, Thomas G. Harpoons and Other Whalecraft. New Bedford: Old Dartmouth Historical Society, 1984. 256 pp.
 Morison, Samuel Eliot. The Maritime History of Massachusetts, 1783–1860 (1921) 400pp full text online
 Reeves, R. R., T. D. Smith, R. L. Webb, J. Robbins, and P. J. Clapham. 2002. Humpback and fin whaling in the Gulf of Maine from 1800 to 1918. Mar. Fish. Rev. 64(1):1–12.

Further reading 
Tucker Jones, Ryan, Angela Wanhalla, eds. “New Histories of Pacific Whaling,” RCC Perspectives: Transformations in Environment and Society 2019, no. 5. doi.org/10.5282/rcc/8954.

External links 

 Archaeological excavation of a 19th-century whaleship buried under San Francisco
 History of the American Whale Fishery Industry
 History of Whale oil on Nantucket on Plum TV
 Whaling: Early Photos – slideshow by Life magazine
 Whaling in New Zealand in the 19th & 20th centuries; from Te Ara, the Encyclopaedia of New Zealand
 "Whaling Tools in the Nantucket Whaling Museum" by Robert E. Hellman
 Journal of the Ship Nauticon: A Digital Exhibition from the Nantucket Historical Association This journal of a whaling voyage was kept by the captain's wife, Susan C. Austin Veeder, 1848–1853.
 Whaling in Alaska and the Yukon (Bering Sea and Arctic Ocean, mostly late 19th early 20th centuries)
 New York Times article 1891: Working for shares, depletion of whales
 "Into the Deep: America, Whaling & the World", PBS, American Experience, 2010.

Environmental history
History of the Arctic
Whaling
Whaling